The  is a professional wrestling tag team title in Japanese promotion All Japan Pro Wrestling (AJPW). It was created on November 16, 1955, in the Japan Wrestling Association (JWA) when King Kong Czaya and Tiger Joginder Singh defeated JWA founder Rikidōzan and Harold Sakata in a tournament final. Originally it was the top tag team title in the JWA, but its status became secondary once the NWA International Tag Team Championship was brought from the United States. It was abandoned in 1973 when the JWA closed, but was later revived in 1976 by AJPW in response to New Japan Pro-Wrestling (NJPW) announcing the creation of its own version of the title. It is currently one of two tag team titles in AJPW, along with the World Tag Team Championship. It is also the current oldest active title in Japan. 

There have been a total of 119 official reigns and 34 vacancies, with the first 27 reigns from the JWA also being recognized by AJPW. There have been a total of 87 teams consisting of 101 distinctive champions who have won the championship. The current champions are Atsushi Onita and Yoshitatsu who are in their first reign as a team.

Title history

Combined reigns

By team

By wrestler
*Combined defense statistics might be inaccurate in the case of the 1960s and 1970s when the titles were rarely defended or the documentation about title matches were uncertain.

Notes

See also

Japan Pro Wrestling Alliance
Triple Crown Heavyweight Championship
World Tag Team Championship
World Junior Heavyweight Championship

References

External links
Title history at All-Japan.co.jp
Title history at Wrestling-Titles.com

All Japan Pro Wrestling championships
Tag team wrestling championships
Continental professional wrestling championships
1955 establishments in Japan
Japan Pro Wrestling Alliance championships